"Do the Bart" is a single from 2 Live Crew from their album Banned in the U.S.A. It has relatively little profanity compared to most of their songs. The song is about a dance.

Success
It reached No. 76 on the U.S. Billboard Hot R&B/Hip-Hop Songs chart. Unlike some of their other singles, especially "Me So Horny," "Do the Bart" had virtually no controversy.

Music video
The music video, directed by Tas Salini, starts off with two men with Bart Simpson-style hairdos coming up saying they will "do the bart." The two men then do the dance they call the "Bart" and Fresh Kid Ice and Brother Marquis are shown rapping while women in swimsuits are shown dancing.

Charts

2 Live Crew songs
1990 songs
1991 singles
Luke Records singles
Songs about dancing